{{Infobox person
| name   = Juliana Kanyomozi
| image = 
| caption  = 
| alias               =   
| birth_date   = 
| birth_place  = Uganda
| death_date   = 
| death_place  = 
| education    = Namasagali College
| occupation   = 
| children = 1
| credits      = {{plainlist|
 Tusker Project Fame Kiwani}}
| title        = 
| relatives    = Laura Kahunde (sister)
| module=

}}

Juliana Kanyomozi (born 27 November 1980) is a musician actress and entertainer by occupation. Juliana Kanyomozi is a multiple award-winning Ugandan pop musician, an R&B and Afro Beat Singer well known among Western Uganda's decent musicians. Juliana was born November 27, 1980, from Toro Fort Portal in Western Uganda, Mutooro by tribe. A Ugandan musician, actress and entertainer. She is one of Western Uganda's descent and musicians including Angella Katatumba, Allan Toniks and Ray G

Background and education
Kanyomozi is a first cousin to King Rukidi IV of Toro. Her father `was a drummer and her grandmother was a vocalist. Juliana attended City Primary School currently Arya Primary School for her primary education. She then joined Bugema Secondary School for her O-Level education and then Namasagali College in Kamuli District for her high school education.

Career
Kanyomozi was the first female musician to win the Pearl of Africa Music Awards 'Artist of the Year' accolade. In 2008, she made her film debut in Henry Ssali's Kiwani: The Movie.

In March 2014, she signed with international cosmetics company Oriflame to be one of their East African brand ambassadors together with Lady JayDee of Tanzania and Jamila Mbugua of Kenya. More recently, she has collaborated with Nigerian entertainer Flavour.

In 2011 she was nominated in the Pan Africa Artiste or Group category at that year's Nigeria Entertainment Awards (NEA). In December 2015, she won a lifetime achievement award in Diva Awards Afrika.

Between 2009 to 2013, she judged at the then popular Tusker Project Fame (TPF) talent search show. In 2010, she did this alongside judges like Ian Mbugua from Kenya and Tanzania’s Hermes Joachim. Gaetano Kagwa alongside other personalities who were the hosts of the show.

Personal life
Kanyomozi had a son, Keron Raphael Kabugo, who died in late July 2014. Her son was asthmatic, but the cause of death was not published.
On Wednesday 12 May 2020, Juliana announced that she had given birth to a baby boy whom she named Taj. In 2006, Kanyomozi had a temporary romantic relationship with United States-based Ugandan boxer Kassim Ouma. On 12 May 2020 she gave birth to a baby boy.

In 2013, Big Eye Magazine'' rated Kanyomozi one of the most beautiful Ugandan women of all-time.

Awards

Won

2010 Tanzania music awards – Best East African Song – "Haturudi Nyuma" with Kidum
2010 Diva Awards Uganda – Best R&B Artist – "Kantambule Naawe"
2011 East African Music Awards – Best Female Artist – "Alive Again"
2011 Diva Music Awards Uganda – Afrobeat Diva – "Sanyu Lyange"
2016 Most Inspirational Song-Zzina Awards - "Woman"

Nominated
2010 Africa Music Awards – Pan African Artist – "Haturudi Nyuma"
2010 Pearl of Africa Music Awards – Female Artist – "Kantambule Naawe"
2011 East African Music Awards – Best East African Collaboration – "Haturudi Nyuma"
2011 Nigeria Entertainment Awards – Pan African Artists – "Alive Again"
2011 Museke Online African Music Awards New York – Best Female Artist, Best Soul/R&B Artist & Best East African Act
2011 Kisima Awards – Best East African /Song of The Year – "Haturudi Nyuma"
2011 Diva Awards Uganda – Super Diva, Exceptional Video, Exceptional Song, R&B Diva – "Alive Again, Sanyu Lyange, Omutima and Libe'esanyu"

Film and television
Juliana Kanyomozi debuted her acting career in 2008 in a Ugandan crime thriller film, Kiwani: The Movie alongside Flavia Tumusiime, Hannington Bugingo and Allan Tumusiime. She was also a judge on East Africa's leading singing competition, Tusker Project Fame from 2009 to 2013. She was also one of the selected African musicians to represent in Coke Studio Africa.

Television

Film

Singles 
Some her most popular songs are listed below:

 Woman
 Omwana
 Kibaluma
 Kanyimbe
 I'm Still Here
 Mundeke
 Nkyanoonya
 Malaika Wange
 Wesigame Kunze
 Enkwanzi
 Yiga Empisa 
 Right Here
 Enkwanzi Yange
 Tombowa Mukwano
 Malaika Wange
 Mundeke
 Tobanakutya
 Mukuume
 Don't Wanna Cry
 Nabikoowa
 Nkulinze
 Ondage Omukwano
 Sayi It Juliana
 Seven Days among others
 Usiende Mbali
 Mpita Njia
 Omutima Guluma
 Nakazadde
 Ndibulungi
 Yegwe
 Kalibatanya
 Sanyu Lyange
 Diana
 Love You Better

Collaborations 

 Juliana ft. Bobi Wine in Taata Wa Baana Yani and Maama Mbiire
 Juliana ft. Sweet Kid in Sirinaayo Mulala
 Juliana ft. Klear Kut in All I Wanna Know.
 Juliana ft. Bushoke a Tanzania Artist in Usiende Mbali
 Juliana ft. Radio and Weasel in Engule
 Juliana ft. GNL Zamba in Wololo
 Juliana ft. Jay Gharter in Love You
 Juliana ft. Hope Mukasa in Ensonga Semasonga
 Juliana ft. Kidum in Hatutrudi Nyuma
 Juliana ft. Vampino and Cindy in Kwe Kunya Kunya

See also

References

External links
 

Living people
1980 births
People from Kabarole District
Toro people
21st-century Ugandan actresses
Ugandan film actresses
21st-century Ugandan women singers
Ugandan television actresses